Watchmen is an American superhero drama limited series based on the 1986 DC Comics series of the same title created by Alan Moore and Dave Gibbons. The TV series was created for HBO by Damon Lindelof, who also served as an executive producer and writer. Its ensemble cast includes Regina King, Don Johnson, Tim Blake Nelson, Yahya Abdul-Mateen II, Andrew Howard, Jacob Ming-Trent, Tom Mison, Sara Vickers, Dylan Schombing, Louis Gossett Jr. and Jeremy Irons. Jean Smart and Hong Chau joined the cast in later episodes.

Lindelof likened the television series to a "remix" of the original comic series. While the series is technically a sequel that takes place 34 years after the events of the comics within the same alternate reality, Lindelof wanted to introduce new characters and conflicts which created a new story within the Watchmen continuity, rather than creating a reboot. The series focuses on events surrounding racist violence in present-day Tulsa, Oklahoma. A white supremacist group called the Seventh Kavalry has taken up arms against the Tulsa Police Department because of perceived racial injustices, causing the police to conceal their identities with masks to prevent the Seventh Kavalry from targeting them in their homes following the "White Night". Angela Abar (King), a detective known as Sister Night, investigates the murder of her friend and the chief of the police, Judd Crawford (Johnson), and discovers secrets regarding the situations around vigilantism.

The series, promoted by HBO as an ongoing drama series, premiered on October 20, 2019, before concluding its nine-episode run on December 15. Lindelof left his role as showrunner after the first season, stating that he had completed his intended story. HBO subsequently confirmed there are no further plans for the show to continue without Lindelof returning in some capacity, and reclassified the work as a limited series with possible future installments.

Watchmen received widespread critical acclaim for its performances, writing, visuals, score, and expansion of the source material, as well as commendation for highlighting the 1921 Tulsa race massacre. The series received several awards, including 26 nominations and 11 wins at the Primetime Emmy Award, including Best Limited Series; King for Best Actress for a Limited Series; and Abdul-Mateen for Best Supporting Actor in a Limited Series — the most for any show in 2020.

Premise 
The series takes place 34 years after the events of the comic series. In the comic's alternate history of the 20th century, vigilantes, once seen as heroes, were outlawed due to their violent methods. In 1985, Adrian Veidt, formerly known as the vigilante Ozymandias, launched a false flag attack on New York City by creating an alien-looking squid monster which resulted in millions in the New York area being killed; this forced the nations to work together against a common threat, averting world war and a nuclear holocaust. Veidt's actions horrified his former companions, with Rorschach planning to tell the world what really happened before being vaporized by Doctor Manhattan, who then left the planet. Unbeknownst to Manhattan, Rorschach had already sent his journal detailing the events to the local newspaper.

The series is set in 2019 Tulsa, Oklahoma. The Seventh Kavalry, a white supremacist group inspired by Rorschach's writings and masked image (having misinterpreted his journal as a racist manifesto), wages violent war against minorities and the police that enforce special reparations for victims of racial injustice. On Christmas Eve 2016, during an event that came to be known as the "White Night", the Kavalry attacked the homes of 40 police officers working for the Tulsa Police Department. Of those who survived, only two stayed with the force: Detective Angela Abar and Police Chief Judd Crawford. As the police force was rebuilt, laws were passed that required police to not disclose their profession and to protect their identities while on the job by wearing masks, which included allowing for costumed police officers. As Crawford's police force attempts to crack down on the Seventh Kavalry, Abar finds herself at the center of two competing plots to kidnap Doctor Manhattan, who has been working with Hooded Justice, the original masked hero and survivor of the Tulsa massacre.

Cast and characters

Main 

 Regina King as Angela Abar / Sister Night, a Tulsa Police detective who wears a nun's habit and a balaclava. Faithe Herman portrays a young Angela Abar.
 Don Johnson as Judd Crawford, the chief of the Tulsa Police who is a member of the Seventh Kavalry.
 Tim Blake Nelson as Wade Tillman / Looking Glass, a Tulsa Police detective who wears a reflective mask. Phil Labes portrays a teenage Wade.
 Yahya Abdul-Mateen II as Cal Abar, Angela's husband who is revealed to be a form of Jonathan Osterman / Doctor Manhattan. Darrell Snedeger portrays Manhattan's original form in a portrait at Laurie Blake's apartment and Zak Rothera-Oxley portrays a young Jon Osterman.
 Andrew Howard as Red Scare, a Tulsa Police detective who wears a predominantly red outfit and speaks with a Russian accent.
 Jacob Ming-Trent as Panda, a Tulsa Police detective who wears a full giant panda mask.
 Tom Mison as Mr. Phillips, a series of male clones of the original Mr. Phillips, created by Doctor Manhattan to serve as Veidt's servants.
 Mison also portrays the Game Warden, a mysterious and powerful clone of the original Mr. Phillips who keeps Veidt in line and serves as his archenemy.
 Sara Vickers as Ms. Crookshanks, a series of female clones of the original Mrs. Crookshanks created by Doctor Manhattan to serve as Veidt's servants.
 Dylan Schombing as Topher Abar, Angela's and Cal's adopted son whose biological parents, the Doyles, were killed on the White Night.
 Louis Gossett Jr. as Will Reeves, Angela's grandfather, formerly known as Hooded Justice, the first masked hero who inspired the Minutemen. Jovan Adepo portrays a young Will Reeves.
 Jeremy Irons as Adrian Veidt, a former businessman and the vigilante Ozymandias, the "smartest man in the world". He is now living as an aristocratic lord of a country manor that is revealed to be on Europa.
 Jean Smart as Laurie Blake, formerly the second Silk Spectre, who has since become an FBI agent and member of the Anti-Vigilante Task Force.
 Hong Chau as Lady Trieu, the owner of Trieu Industries, a corporation that bought out Veidt Enterprises following news of his death, and later revealed to be Veidt's daughter by artificial insemination. Trieu's name is inspired by Vietnamese historical legend Lady Triệu.

Recurring 

 James Wolk as Joe Keene Jr., a senator and leader of the Seventh Kavalry who aims to become president. His father is responsible for the Keene Act banning masked vigilantism.
 Frances Fisher as Jane Crawford, Judd's wife who is a member of the Seventh Kavalry.
 Jessica Camacho as Pirate Jenny, a member of the Tulsa police who wears a pirate-inspired outfit
 Adelynn Spoon as Emma Abar, Angela and Cal's younger adopted daughter.
 Lily Rose Smith as Rosie Abar, Angela and Cal's older adopted daughter.
 Steven Norfleet as O. B. Williams, the late father of Will Reeves and great-grandfather of Angela Abar.
 Alexis Louder as Ruth Williams, the late mother of Will Reeves and great-grandmother of Angela Abar.
 Jolie Hoang-Rappaport as Bian, a young clone of Trieu's mother passed off as her daughter.
 Elyse Dinh portrays Trieu's mother, the original Bian as an adult.

Guest starring 
 Dustin Ingram as Agent Dale Petey, an FBI agent who joins Laurie in investigating a murder in Tulsa. He is secretly a vigilante known as Lube Man.
 Cheyenne Jackson as an actor portraying Hooded Justice on American Hero Story.
 Henry Louis Gates Jr. as himself, in the position of Secretary of the Treasury.
 Jim Beaver as Andy, the Doyle children's paternal grandfather.
 Lee Tergesen as Mister Shadow, a vigilante who is drawn out by Laurie Blake.
 David Andrews as Deputy Director Max Farragut, Laurie Blake and Dale Petey's superior.
 Michael Imperioli as himself, appearing in an advertisement for New York City.
 Chris Whitley as an actor who portrays Captain Metropolis in American Hero Story.
 Eileen Grubba as Cynthia Bennett, Wade's ex-wife.
 Paula Malcomson as Renee, a radiologist who is a member of the Seventh Kavalry.
 Jake McDorman as Nelson Gardner / Captain Metropolis, one of the founding members of the New Minutemen.
 Glenn Fleshler as Fred, a racist shopkeeper who runs afoul of Will.
 Danielle Deadwyler as June, Will's wife and Angela's grandmother who works as a reporter. Valeri Ross portrays an older June.
 Anthony Hill as Marcus Abar, the father of Angela Abar who is killed by a suicide bomber.
 Devyn A. Taylor as Elise Abar, the mother of Angela Abar who is killed by a suicide bomber.
 Ted Johnson as Joe Keene Sr., the senator who passed the Keene Act, father of Joe Keene Jr., and member of Cyclops.

Episodes

Production

Development 
Rumors of a potential Watchmen television series adaptation first came about in October 2015, with HBO in preliminary discussions with Zack Snyder, director of the 2009 Watchmen film. HBO later confirmed that they were seeking to develop a Watchmen series in November 2015.

By June 2017, HBO had begun negotiations with Damon Lindelof, as Snyder was no longer involved with the production. According to Lindelof, he had been long interested in making a Watchmen work since he read the comic as a teenager, and had been approached to write it at least twice before, but rejected the offers as they came out shortly following Snyder's film and felt he could not improve on that. In the interim, he developed the HBO series The Leftovers that ran from 2014 to 2017. The Leftovers was met with high acclaim, and led to yet another offer to write a Watchmen series, which Lindelof then accepted.

Writing for the series started on September 19, 2017. The following day, HBO officially greenlit the production for a pilot and additional backup scripts as well. Nicole Kassell was announced as the director and executive producer for the Lindelof pilot on January 30, 2018. The pilot was filmed around June 2018 in locations around Atlanta, Georgia.

On August 17, 2018, HBO greenlit a full season of Watchmen, scheduling the premiere in 2019. Due to the time between filming the pilot and the remaining episodes, a new production crew had been brought on board, and Kassell remained the director for the second episode to provide necessary continuity. The series' premiere date, October 20, 2019, was announced on September 3, 2019.

The show's credits identify the work as based on characters co-created by Dave Gibbons, who along with Alan Moore created the Watchmen comic. Due to multiple disputes with DC Comics and the producers of previous films, Moore has asked for his name to be no longer associated with any film production of his works from that period, including for the Watchmen film. Gibbons, however, was an active contributor to the show, providing illustrations in the same style as the original comic series. Lindelof tried to reach out to Moore to get his blessing for the show, but was rebuffed. In 2022, Moore claimed Lindelof had sent him a letter that he described as "neurotic rambling", including Lindelof identifying himself as "one of the bastards currently destroying Watchmen". Moore said he replied with a request to not contact him as he did not wish to be associated with the adaptation.

Writing 

Lindelof stated that his vision for the series was to be a "remix" of the comic series. While the show is a sequel to the comic, he wanted to make a story of his own that felt part of that universe without creating a reboot, and made sure that this was apparent from the first episode. He affirmed this idea in an open letter to fans posted on May 22, 2018.

One of the first challenges for Lindelof was determining what the focus of the narrative would be. He considered that at the time the original Watchmen comic was released, it reflected on the public anxiety over the ongoing Cold War. In looking for a similar anxiety for contemporary times, Lindelof determined that racial tensions posed the same type of larger picture that would work well for the Watchmen universe, since it presented both historical and present conflicts. He also felt "to not tell a story about race in the context of a political text in 2019 almost felt borderline irresponsible". Establishing racism as a central theme, Lindelof assembled a purposely-diverse writing staff, with half the writers being black, and half being female, to help provide proper perspective towards these issues.

Lindelof opted to open the pilot on the 1921 Tulsa race massacre, an event that he became aware of after reading The Atlantic article "The Case for Reparations" written by Ta-Nehisi Coates in 2014. Lindelof, curious about the massacre, found there was very little information about it, and strove to learn more. Many aspects of the plot center on the legacy of the graphic novel and the event. This was around the time that he had been approached again to write for the Watchmen series, and felt the massacre and its implication for the alternate reality's present would provide an equivalent factor that the Doomsday Clock had been for the original comic series, and used racial conflict as a central element of the series. He believed it would also help more people learn about the 1921 event, and made sure it was represented accurately, including the representation in how aerial attacks were used to bombard the Greenwood district.

Lindelof had conceived of Angela as the central character that everything revolves around, with the discovery that her grandfather Will, a black man, was one of the first costumed heroes, Hooded Justice, shown only in a few panels from the original comics. Hooded Justice's identity was never established in the original comic series, and Lindelof's suggestion that he was a black man created a challenge for the writers. One of the first tasks the writing staff had was to determine how Will would become Hooded Justice, effectively establishing the plot to the sixth episode "This Extraordinary Being". To further tie to the comic series, the writing staff only considered using the established characters that would best serve Angela's story so that she would remain the focus. To that end, they had established that characters like Doctor Manhattan, Laurie Blake, and Adrian Veidt were necessary to support Angela's discovery of her legacy. They had considered including Dan Dreiberg, the second Nite Owl, as well, but Lindelof wanted to have a fair balance of old and new characters within the show, and felt that adding Dan would have tipped the balance too far away from the new characters. They did consider Dan's fate as part of the "Peteypedia" additional materials created by the show's writers, in which Dan remains in prison after he and Laurie were arrested for vigilantism in the past, and refusing to accept the FBI's offer to work with them as Laurie had done.

Lindelof used his experience from his past shows to plot out the season prior to writing, stating "What I've learned over time is you need to know the answers to the mysteries...If you don't know those, you're lost. Every time you come to an intersection, you won't know whether to turn left or right." The writers had established some of the season's key mysteries in writing for the pilot, such as Hooded Justice being Will Reeves and Cal being Doctor Manhattan, but how these were to be revealed to the characters in the show and the audience came later in the writing process. Ten episodes were planned for the first season. After completing the sixth episode, "This Extraordinary Being", Lindelof felt the story was closer to its ending rather than as a midpoint, and that if they continued for four additional episodes, one of them would have been filler, and instead opted to conclude the story with three episodes. The omitted episode would have likely covered more of Lady Trieu's backstory, according to Lindelof, though it would not have been exclusively devoted to that topic. Instead, some of this material was covered in conversations within the seventh episode "An Almost Religious Awe".

A show-within-the-show, American Hero Story, was used to tell the purported backstory of Hooded Justice. Writer Cord Jefferson said American Hero Story was meant to be the opposite to what they were creating for the actual show, a "cheesy" production that perpetuated the in-universe myth of Hooded Justice being a white man. Lindelof said the show was designed to be comparable to Ryan Murphy's series American Horror Story and American Crime Story, and had even considered bringing in Murphy to play himself as the producer of American Hero Story. He opted against this, but still treated American Hero Story like a Murphy work, and taking its producer to be somewhat secretive and seclusive, like Murphy. Some media critics took the American Hero Story segments to be a parody of Zack Snyder's 2009 live-action adaptation of Watchmen, but Lindelof and Kassell asserted this was not their intent. Kassell said, "I fully admire [Snyder] as a filmmaker so to hear that it could even be used as a negative comment feels terrible. What I was wanting to do with those (American Hero Story scenes) is like, 'This is the version we could make,' and we are very concretely not making that version. We're grounding our story in a much more real kind of naturalism."

Casting 
On May 23, 2018, it was announced that Regina King, Don Johnson, Tim Blake Nelson, Louis Gossett Jr., Adelaide Clemens, and Andrew Howard had joined the cast of the pilot. At least one of the actors was expected to have been cast in a potentially recurring role. In June 2018, it was reported that Jeremy Irons, Tom Mison, Frances Fisher, Jacob Ming-Trent, Yahya Abdul-Mateen II, and Sara Vickers had been cast in the pilot. On August 7, 2018, it was announced that Dylan Schombing, Adelynn Spoon, and Lily Rose Smith had joined the pilot's cast. In November 2018, it was reported that Jean Smart had been cast in a starring role and that James Wolk would appear in a recurring capacity. Additionally, it was confirmed that Irons would portray Adrian Veidt / Ozymandias, that Nelson would portray a newly devised character named Looking Glass, and that Vickers and Mison would join the cast. In January 2019, it was announced that Hong Chau and Dustin Ingram had been cast in recurring roles.

The performances of the cast during the pilot and other scenes influenced later episodes in the show's writing. When filming Irons for the pilot, Lindelof and his team found he took the character of Veidt in a comedic direction, something not suggested by the original comic series. They recognized that this was "a slightly absurd and ridiculous treatment of the character" that worked for Veidt's role within the show, and stuck with it in writing the later episodes.

While reports in July 2019 suggested that actor Robert Redford would play a fictionalized version of himself in the series, Lindelof affirmed later that the real Redford would not be appearing in the show; the use of Redford is a tribute to the closing pages of the original comic where it is suggested that Redford was positioning himself for president, in much the same way actor Ronald Reagan became president.

Music 

Trent Reznor and Atticus Ross of Nine Inch Nails were announced as the series' composers on September 20, 2018. In considering the series music, Lindelof had considered using Reznor and Ross as they had not composed for television before. By coincidence, when Lindelof suggested the pair to HBO, HBO reported that the two had been in contact with the network about doing the music just a few days prior, as they were big fans of Watchmen. Reznor stated he and Ross were also fans of Lindelof's previous work and thus sought to offer their services for the show. Reznor and Ross had already prepared pieces for the pilot episode prior to filming, allowing Lindelof to better incorporate it into the pilot. According to Reznor, their initial compositions were set for "an aggressive, sort of sleazy tone" for the show, but adapted to the series as it changed tone throughout the first season.

Reznor and Ross released three albums of music from the show on both vinyl albums and through streaming services. The first volume was released on November 4, the second on November 25, and the third on December 16, 2019.

In addition to new compositions, the show employed licensed music selected by music supervisor Liza Richardson. Similar to how music and lyric references were employed in the original comic series, the soundtrack's song titles and lyrics frequently tied in with narrative elements of the show. For example, several songs from the musical Oklahoma! are used, given the show's setting in Tulsa. "A God Walks into Abar", in which the blue-skinned Doctor Manhattan is introduced, used a number of songs themed around the color blue, such as "Rhapsody in Blue" and "The Blue Danube". The final episode "See How They Fly" incorporates many of the unusual phrases from the Beatles' "I Am the Walrus" into its visual elements.

Filming 

Principal photography for the pilot commenced May 30, 2018, and lasted through June 2, 2018, in Cedartown, Georgia. Filming began on the 97th anniversary of the start of the riots during the second day of the production schedule on May 31.  Throughout the month, filming occurred in additional Georgia cities and towns, including Macon, Fayetteville, Newnan, Palmetto, Brooks, Griffin, Georgia and Tucker. In October 2018, filming for the remainder of the first season began in Georgia. Filming locations that month included Palmetto, Brookhaven, Peachtree City, Decatur, and the MARTA station in Chamblee. In November 2018, shooting moved to locales such as Palmetto, Chamblee, McDonough, and the West Lake MARTA station. In December 2018, the production was working out of Union City, Newnan, and the Georgia World Congress Center. Interior shooting was filmed at Atlanta Metro Studios in Union City.

Filming of the country manor scenes was treated as a separate production, similar in nature to the Tales of the Black Freighter comic narrative within the original Watchmen graphic novel. Filming of these scenes took place in September 2018 in Wales at Penrhyn Castle. These were completed before most of the remaining episode scripts were finished, according to actor Tom Mison. According to Lindelof, these scenes are "the idea is doing an escape story with Adrian Veidt that's more like Wile E. Coyote and the Road Runner than it was like Escape from Alcatraz, that felt too delicious to not do". Until the third episode, HBO did not identify Irons' character as Veidt, but only as "Lord of a Country Manor". Lindelof chose to keep Veidt's identity a secret in part to avoid having the show be considered a sequel of the comic, as well as in keeping with the storytelling mystery used by the comic, in which the identity of Rorschach is not revealed until midway through the series.

Marketing 
The first teaser for the series, named "Tick Tock", first aired on May 8, 2019.

With release of each episode, HBO released additional content on a special site named "Peteypedia", a collection of files written in-universe by Dale Petey and from other excerpts. Peteypedia was developed after most of the filming was completed, with writer Jeff Jensen overseeing it. The writing team were aware they had developed too much information that would fit into the broadcast show and debated how to present this, including as post-credit scenes or through social media. At the same time, HBO was working with Reznor and Ross on how to release the albums and were considering including additional liner notes in the vinyl releases, which included the additional background material the writers had developed. This led to creating reports and clippings similar to those presented in the original Watchmen comic, and presenting this as part of Peteypedia. Peteypedia allowed them, for example, to explain Laurie's trajectory from being the second Silk Spectre and fighting crime with Nite Owl at the end of the comic series, to becoming an FBI agent, elements of this that they had written briefly into the show but did not have broadcast time to spell out. They also tied elements back to the original comic. Of note is the fictional novel Fogdancing, written in-universe by Max Shea, one of the people who Veidt had employed to devise the alien squid attack in 1985. Jensen said that in the extra material with the graphic novel, Fogdancing had been made into a film at least twice, so the writers considered the work to be seminal to the characters in the television series, having the book appear at least twice during the show. Jensen created a whole plot summary of the work based on minimal clues from the comic, making the work to be about super-soldiers and having it tie to the idea of the Watchmen superhero culture.

Continuation 
While HBO had not yet confirmed a second season following the show's broadcast, Lindelof stated that if there were, he would not likely be back for it, but instead have another producer step forward to tell another story set in this universe. Lindelof said he felt that the show was "not my story" and that "These nine episodes are sort of everything that I have to say at this point about Watchmen". Lindelof created the first season to be a complete story, in the same manner that each season of Fargo and True Detective were each self-contained stories. Following the broadcast of the season one finale, Lindelof still said that the story he told during the season was everything he could put forward about Watchmen, with a definitive beginning, middle, and end. However, he agreed with HBO that Watchmen should be treated as a continuing series, and did not rule out returning, but would want to have time to develop a similar complete story before committing.

By January 2020, Lindelof stated he had passed on a second season but gave his blessing to anyone that followed him as showrunner. HBO's programming chief Casey Bloys stated with regards to a second season that "It would be hard to imagine doing it without Damon involved in some way", while not altogether dismissing the possibility of the concept of one. Due to this, HBO reclassified Watchmen as a limited series in February 2020, with the potential for additional installments.

Broadcast and distribution 
The series was first broadcast on the HBO network from October 20 through December 15, 2019. In New Zealand, Watchmen is distributed exclusively by Neon, Sky Television's subscription television series. In Australia, the series is distributed by Foxtel's streaming service.

The series was released onto digital media for purchase or streaming in December 2019. Warner Bros. Home Entertainment released the series on Blu-ray under the title Watchmen: An HBO Limited Series on June 2, 2020.

Across May and June 2020, the George Floyd protests arose as black people and others protested against police violence, and some saw Watchmen as a "predictive text for the current moment". HBO made the series available for free streaming from its website and other on demand services on the weekend of June 19, 2020, in observation of Juneteenth, identifying the show "highlighting Black experiences, voices and storytellers" as "this timely, poignant series that explores the legacy of systemic racism in America".

Reception

Critical response 

Watchmen received widespread critical acclaim. On review aggregator website Rotten Tomatoes, the series has a 96 percent "certified fresh" rating based on 398 reviews, with an average rating of 8.6/10. The website's critical consensus reads, "Bold and bristling, Watchmen isn't always easy viewing, but by adding new layers of cultural context and a host of complex characters it expertly builds on its source material to create an impressive identity of its own." On Metacritic, it has a weighted average score of 85 out of 100, based on 35 critics, indicating "universal acclaim".

Rotten Tomatoes' audience score is lower than the critics' consensus, with several news outlets reporting that the site was review bombed. Esquire writer Matt Miller alleged that "far-right trolls" artificially deflated the audience score. These outlets agree that the chief complaint among followers of the source material is that the image of fan-favorite character Rorschach is adopted by the Seventh Kavalry, a white supremacist organization. Many fans agreed with the television series' use of Rorschach's image, citing Alan Moore's intention in the original Watchmen to comment on fascist undertones within the superhero genre. Other fans have claimed that the show fails to properly reflect the complexities of Rorschach's character. In response, Damon Lindelof stated that the show is not intended to portray Walter Kovacs, the original Rorschach, as a racist. At the New York Comic Con, he explained that Rorschach's journal had been misinterpreted by the New Frontiersman and that his image has been misappropriated by the Seventh Kavalry. "He's been dead for over 30 years," Lindelof clarified. "He doesn't get to say, 'You misunderstood me. No, I wasn't a white supremacist.' They decided what he was."

Patrick Wilson, who played Dan Dreiberg / Nite Owl in the 2009 film adaptation, praised the series, saying he was initially curious based on his familiarity with the source material but said he was hooked by the cast and wound up loving the series.

Ratings

Audience viewership 
According to HBO, the first episode of Watchmen had more than 1.5 million viewers on its first night across television and streaming services, the strongest debut performance for the network. The first broadcast of the episode, at 9 p.m. EDT, had 800,000 viewers, making it the most viewed debut episode for any premium-cable show in 2019. The second episode dropped to about 1.3 million viewers across the first night, with 765,000 watching the first broadcast, though this was considered a strong performance as the show aired alongside Game 5 of the 2019 World Series.

As of episode 9, HBO reported 7 million viewers to date, making it HBO's most viewed new series since Big Little Lies. HBO estimates that the Sunday night premiere viewership represents only about 10 percent of the total viewership for an episode, to the effect of word-of-mouth that has brought new viewers to the show, with the first episode having a total of 9.6 million viewers as of December 4, 2019.

Accolades 
Among the various awards, Watchmen led total nominations of the main Primetime and Creative Arts Emmy Awards for the 2019–20 television season with a total of 26 nominations, and won a combined 11 awards, including Outstanding Limited Series, Outstanding Lead Actress in a Limited Series or Movie (for Regina King), Outstanding Supporting Actor in a Limited Series or Movie (for Yahya Abdul-Mateen II) and Outstanding Writing for a Limited Series, Movie or Dramatic Special (for Damon Lindelof and Cord Jefferson) for the episode "This Extraordinary Being".

Legacy 
Watchmen had been critically praised for presenting the events of the Tulsa race massacre of 1921. Until the show premiered, while historians had documented the event, few filmmakers were able to successfully acquire funding for projects that addressed the event due to its relative obscurity in American history. Watchmen served as a "catalyst" for more interest in works related to the massacre ahead of the event's 100th anniversary in 2021, according to The Washington Post DeNeen Brown. At least four separate documentaries were produced in advance of the anniversary, and there was an increase in depictions of the event in other works, such as in HBO's Lovecraft Country.

Notes

References

External links 
 
 "Peteypedia", related in-universe database collected by the character of FBI Agent Dale Petey
 

2010s American black television series
2010s American drama television miniseries
2019 American television series debuts
2019 American television series endings
Adaptations of Watchmen
Alternate history television series
American superhero television series
English-language television shows
Fiction set on Europa (moon)
HBO original programming
Nonlinear narrative television series
Peabody Award-winning television programs
Primetime Emmy Award for Outstanding Miniseries winners
Primetime Emmy Award-winning television series
Racism in television
Television series about cloning
Television series by Paramount Television
Television series by Warner Bros. Television Studios
Television series created by Damon Lindelof
Television series set in 1985
Television series set in 2019
Television shows based on DC Comics
Television shows filmed in Georgia (U.S. state)
Television shows set in Tulsa, Oklahoma
Television shows set in Vietnam
Vigilante television series
Harvey Award winners